Anau may refer to:

 Anau, Bora Bora, commune in Bora Bora
 Anau, Turkmenistan, city in Turkmenistan